Cotys II (Ancient Greek: Κότυς) was a king of the Sapaean kingdom of Thrace from 42 to ca. 15 BC, succeeding his father, Rhescuporis I.

References

See also 
List_of_rulers_of_Thrace_and_Dacia

 
1st-century BC rulers in Europe
Thracian kings
Roman client rulers